Fenpiprane is a drug used for functional gastrointestinal disorders.

References 

1-Piperidinyl compounds
Abandoned drugs
Benzene derivatives